Keiko Muto (born February 15, 1972) is a Japanese sprint canoer who competed in the early to mid-1990s. At the 1992 Summer Olympics in Barcelona, she was eliminated in the semifinals of the K-2 500 m event. Four years later in Atlanta, Muto was eliminated in the semifinals of the K-4 500 m event.

External links
Sports-Reference.com profile

1972 births
Canoeists at the 1992 Summer Olympics
Canoeists at the 1996 Summer Olympics
Japanese female canoeists
Living people
Olympic canoeists of Japan
Asian Games medalists in canoeing
Canoeists at the 1994 Asian Games
Medalists at the 1994 Asian Games
Asian Games bronze medalists for Japan